Two Japanese light novel series were commission and created for the Blood+ anime series produced by Production I.G and Aniplex. The first, also named Blood+, written by Ryō Ikehata with illustrations by Chizu Hashii, is a four volume series and the official novel adaptation of the anime series. It expands on the events of the anime and gives greater background information on the battle against chiropterans. The first volume was released in Japan on May 1, 2006 by Kadokawa Shoten under their male-oriented Sneaker Bunko label. The remaining volumes released every four months until the final volume was released on May 1, 2007.

The second adaptation, Blood+: Russian Rose, is a two-volume series written by Karino Minazuki and illustrated by Ryō Takagi. It was released at the same time as Blood+, with the first volume released on May 1, 2006 and the second on September 1, 2006. The series, published under Kadokawa's more female-oriented Beans Bunko label, details Saya and Hagi's lives at the start of the 20th century and the Russian Revolution.

Both novel series have been licensed for release in English in North America by Dark Horse Comics. Dark Horse released the first translated Blood+ novel on March 19, 2008.

Volume list

Blood+

Blood+: Russian Rose

Notes

References

Blood+
Blood: The Last Vampire